Ready for Love is a 1934 American romantic comedy film directed by Marion Gering and presented by Adolph Zukor for Paramount Pictures. It stars  Richard Arlen, Ida Lupino, and Marjorie Rambeau. It is inspired by the play The Whipping by Eulalie Spence, based on the 1930 novel The Whipping by Roy Flanagan. The film is about school runaway Marigold Tate (Ida Lupino) who "journeys to her retired aunt's home where she soon faces small-town bigotry", and falls in love with handsome newspaper editor Julian Barrow (Richard Arlen).

The film marks the first appearance of Terry, the Cairn Terrier who would go on to appear as Toto in The Wizard of Oz (1939).

Plot summary
Marigold Tate (Lupino) runs away from boarding school to stay with her retired aunt. She faces hostility from the locals, who display bigotry and snobbery towards her. During a witchcraft trial she is forced into a pool of water. The event is covered by newspaper editor Julian Barrow (Arlen), who falls in love with Tate. The couple eventually move to New York, where Barrow gets a job on a newspaper.

Cast
Richard Arlen as Julian Barrow
Ida Lupino as Marigold Tate
Marjorie Rambeau as Goldie Tate
Junior Durkin as Joey Burke
Beulah Bondi as Mrs. Burke
Esther Howard as Aunt Ida
Ralph Remley 	as Chester Burke
Charles Arnt as Sam Gardner
Henry Travers 	as Judge Pickett
Charles Sellon 	as Caleb Hooker

Production
Actress Ida Lupino was stricken with polio soon after filming commenced and was concerned during production that she might have to spend the rest of her life in a wheelchair.

References

External links
 

1934 films
American romantic comedy films
1934 romantic comedy films
Paramount Pictures films
Films directed by Marion Gering
Films based on American novels
American black-and-white films
1930s American films